Sanchai Ratiwatana and Sonchat Ratiwatana were the defending champions, but they decided not to compete this year.

Seeds

Draw

Draw

References
 Main Draw

2013 ATP Challenger Tour
2013 Men's Doubles
2013 in Russian tennis